Lüleburgaz railway station is a station in the village Durak, Turkey. Ever since the station was opened, a settlement began around its vicinity, which later became the village of Durak. TCDD Taşımacılık operates a daily regional train from Istanbul to Kapıkule, which stops at Lüleburgaz station.

The station was originally opened in 1873 by the Oriental Railway.

Images

References

External links
Station timetable

Railway stations in Kırklareli Province
Railway stations opened in 1873
1873 establishments in the Ottoman Empire
Lüleburgaz District